Shark Island Light is an active pile lighthouse located just north of Shark Island, an island in Sydney Harbour, New South Wales, Australia. Its light is only visible on in the fairway of the harbour, between Shark Point and Point Piper.

Site operation 
The light is operated by the Sydney Ports Corporation, while the site is managed by the Department of Environment, Climate Change and Water as part of the Sydney Harbour National Park.

Visiting 
The lighthouse itself is only accessible by boat, and it is closed to the public. However, it is visible from Shark Island at close range. The island itself is open to the public, but capacity is limited and reservations are required.

See also 

 List of lighthouses in Australia

References

External links 
 

Lighthouses completed in 1913
Lighthouses in Sydney
1913 establishments in Australia